Isaac Bryan Mina Arboleda (born 17 October 1980) is an Ecuadorian footballer who plays club football for Clan Juvenil of Ecuador.

Club career
Mina broke in as a youth in his hometown club, Esmeraldas Petrolero. However, he opted for a team of higher calibre in Club Deportivo ESPOLI of Quito. In 2006, Mina played for Deportivo Azogues, where he impressed with his display of power in the air. After a short and unsuccessful spell in Barcelona SC in 2007, he returned to Quito with Deportivo Quito, where he got his chance of starting and making the national team.

Transfer Rumors
In July 2008, it was rumoured that Chievo Verona of the Italian Serie A was interested in making a move for him.

In December 2008, it was said that River Plate was interested in acquiring Mina's services.

International career
Mina was first called up for a friendly against Haiti in spring of 2008, beating them 3–1. He then made an appearance for the Ecuador national team in an important friendly against world powers France. Despite going down 2–0 against them, Mina impressed with his defensive ability and might. He was successful in keeping Lionel Messi scoreless during the 2010 FIFA World Cup qualifier against Argentina, eventually drawing 1–1 in Buenos Aires. He also featured in the 0–0 draw with Colombia in Quito. Mina is now seen as Ecuador's starting leftback.

On 15 October 2008, he scored his first international goal in a qualifier against Venezuela, despite their losing 3–1.

References

External links

1980 births
Living people
Sportspeople from Esmeraldas, Ecuador
Ecuadorian footballers
Ecuador international footballers
C.D. ESPOLI footballers
Deportivo Azogues footballers
Barcelona S.C. footballers
S.D. Quito footballers
Association football defenders